Winnie the Witch was originally a DC Thomson comic strip in The Beano in 1948 and later on in Sparky from 1965 to 1967, featuring a witch named Winnie. The strip was first drawn in the Beano by Jimmy Clark, and in Sparky by Bernard Greenbaum.

Synopsis 
Winnie is a novice witch who would sometimes play mischievous tricks which mostly backfired. Also when trying to be helpful her poor mastery of magic gave undesired results, and she would often get into trouble with her boss the 'Chief Witch'.

References

External links
 specimen strip

Beano strips
DC Thomson Comics strips
Comics about magic
British comics characters
1948 comics debuts
1967 comics endings
Comics characters introduced in 1948
Comics characters who use magic
Comics about women
Gag-a-day comics
Humor comics
Fictional witches